Kamareddy Assembly constituency is a constituency of Telangana Legislative Assembly, India. It is one of four constituencies in Kamareddy district. It is part of the Zahirabad Lok Sabha constituency.

Gampa Govardhan of TRS won the election in 2009, 2011, 2014 and 2018.

Mandals
The Assembly Constituency presently comprises the following Mandals:

Members of Legislative Assembly

Election results

Telangana Legislative Assembly election, 2018

Telangana Legislative Assembly election, 2014

See also
 List of constituencies of Telangana Legislative Assembly

References

Assembly constituencies of Telangana
Kamareddy district